The Swann Covered Bridge, also called the Joy Covered Bridge or Swann-Joy Covered Bridge, is a county-owned, wood-and-metal combination style covered bridge that spans the Locust Fork of the Black Warrior River in Blount County, Alabama, United States.

Built in 1933, the  bridge is a Town lattice truss with three spans. Its WGCB number is 01-05-05. The Swann Covered Bridge was listed on the National Register of Historic Places on August 20, 1981. It is currently the longest existing historic covered bridge in Alabama and second longest in the state overall after the  Twin Creek Covered Bridge in Midway, Alabama, which was built in 2000. The Swann Covered Bridge is maintained by the Blount County Commission and the Alabama Department of Transportation.

History
The Swann Covered Bridge was built by a crew led by Zelma C. Tidwell over a scenic gorge of the Locust Fork on property owned by the Swann Farm. It was originally dubbed the 'Joy Covered Bridge', as the bridge connected Cleveland with the nearby community of Joy. The bridge was restored by the Blount County Commission in 1979. After the  Nectar Covered Bridge (also located in Blount County) burned down in 1993, the Swann Covered Bridge became the longest covered bridge existing in Alabama. It is one of three historic covered bridges remaining in Blount County.

After a routine inspection, the Swann Covered Bridge was closed in 2009 due to unsafe conditions along with nearby Easley Covered Bridge. The Horton Mill Covered Bridge was already closed as a result of vandalism which occurred in 2007. Restoration of all three bridges began in late 2011. Money for these projects primarily came from the federal National Historic Covered Bridge Preservation Program as well as transportation enhancement funds. The $469,110 construction contract was awarded to Bob Smith Construction of Trussville, Alabama. The Swann Covered Bridge would be the first of the three to be restored. Wooden structural pieces were repaired or replaced as needed and new tin roofs were put on all three bridges in order to keep the weather off vital supporting timbers. Total restoration costs for the covered bridges was approximately $540,000. The difference was covered by county expenditures.

Following necessary repairs and upgrades, the Swann Covered Bridge was reopened to motor vehicle traffic on October 22, 2012. Photos of restoration to the bridge can be viewed via The Birmingham News on AL.com (linked below).

In late 2015, cameras were installed at the three remaining covered bridges in Blount County to help deter vandalism after graffiti was found on the Easley Covered Bridge a year earlier. It has since been cleaned and re-painted.

2018 motor vehicle accident
On June 9, 2018, the Swann Covered Bridge was closed until further notice after an SUV sped around a curve and crashed into its western entrance. The incident was caught on a bridge camera. There was moderate damage to the bridge and concrete support, estimated at a little under $50,000. The bridge was reopened by December 31, 2018.

2021 motor vehicle accident
On November 15, 2021, a box truck which was apparently too high for the proper clearance damaged both ends of the Swann Covered Bridge while passing through it. The bridge was able to remain open to motor vehicle traffic until repairs could be made within the coming weeks.

During their January 2022 monthly meeting, the Blount County Commission began to look into placing clearance bars at each end of the Swann and Easley covered bridges along with putting speed bumps at the approaches, recommended by the county engineer, in order to improve motor vehicle safety. The Commission had also voted to permanently close the nearby Horton Mill Covered Bridge to motor vehicle traffic, effective April 1, 2022.

Dimensions
Main Span Length: 

Total Span Length: 

Deck Width: 

Vertical Clearance: 

Underclearance: 

Above measurements are approximate and unofficial. Total span length is not always the same as total bridge length.

See also
List of bridges documented by the Historic American Engineering Record in Alabama
List of Alabama covered bridges

Notes

References
 "Bridges to the Past: Alabama's Covered Bridges", webpage: alabamatv.org-photos . Retrieved Aug. 15, 2007.
 "Alabama Bureau of Tourism & Travel", webpage: 800alabama.com . Retrieved Aug. 15, 2007.
 "Alabamiana: A Guide to Alabama", webpage: al.com-alabamiana-bridges. Retrieved Aug. 15, 2007.
 Judy Woodward Bates, "Blount County, Alabama" (article), AmericanProfile.com, 2000-12-24, webpage: americanprofile-282. Retrieved 2009-01-04.
 Mark G. Stith, "Tunnels in time", Southern Living, October 1997, webpage: findarticles-851. Retrieved 2009-01-04.
 Dale J. Travis, "Covered Bridges", webpage: dalejtravis-505. Retrieved Aug. 15, 2007 and Dec. 16, 2009.
 Alabama Power News Center. Swann CB: Credits. Retrieved May 30, 2013.
 AL.com via The Birmingham News. Swann CB: Credits. Retrieved May 30, 2013.
 Ancestry.com SSDI. Horton Mill CB: Credits. Retrieved May 8, 2014.

External links

Bridges completed in 1933
National Register of Historic Places in Blount County, Alabama
Covered bridges on the National Register of Historic Places in Alabama
Wooden bridges in Alabama
Transportation buildings and structures in Blount County, Alabama
Tourist attractions in Blount County, Alabama
Pedestrian bridges in Alabama
Former road bridges in the United States
Historic American Engineering Record in Alabama
Road bridges on the National Register of Historic Places in Alabama
Lattice truss bridges in the United States